Pavol Orolín (born 30 June 1987 in Liptovský Mikuláš) is a Slovak football midfielder who currently plays for Dynamo Malženice.

References

External links
Bohemians 1905 profile

1987 births
Living people
Sportspeople from Liptovský Mikuláš
Slovak footballers
Association football midfielders
Bohemians 1905 players
MFK Ružomberok players
MŠK Turany players
ŠK Senec players
FK Pohronie players
TJ Sokol Dolná Ždaňa players
Syrianska IF Kerburan players
ŠKM Liptovský Hrádok players
OFK Malženice players
2. Liga (Slovakia) players
3. Liga (Slovakia) players
4. Liga (Slovakia) players
Czech First League players
Expatriate footballers in the Czech Republic
Slovak expatriate sportspeople in the Czech Republic
Expatriate footballers in Sweden
Slovak expatriate sportspeople in Sweden